Suzanne Geist (born Suzanne Henderson on November 21, 1961 in St. Louis, Missouri) is a member of the state legislature in the U.S. state of Nebraska. She graduated from Pine Bluff High School in Pine Bluff, Arkansas in 1980. Afterwards, she attended the University of Nebraska-Lincoln and graduated with a bachelor's degree in journalism and broadcasting in 1984.

In 2016, Geist was elected to represent the 25th Nebraska legislative district, which encompasses the northeast quarter of Lancaster County including the city of Waverly and the eastern portions of the city of Lincoln.  She currently sits on the Natural Resources and the Transportation and Telecommunications committees.

Geist is a candidate in the 2023 Lincoln, Nebraska mayoral election.

References

1961 births
Living people
Women state legislators in Nebraska
Republican Party Nebraska state senators
21st-century American politicians
Politicians from Lincoln, Nebraska
Politicians from St. Louis
Politicians from Pine Bluff, Arkansas
University of Nebraska–Lincoln alumni
21st-century American women politicians